Mogral is a census town in Kasaragod district in the state of Kerala, India. Mogral is part of Kumbla Grama Panchayat. The Mogral River flows on the southern border of Mogral.

Demographics
As of 2011 Census, Mogral had a population of 8,912 with 4,223 males and 4,689 females. Mogral had an average literacy of 89.84% higher than the national average of 74.04% and lower than state average of 94.00%; male literacy was 94% and female literacy was 86.17%.

Transportation
National Highway 66 runs through Mogral, which connects Mogral to Mangalore in north and Kasaragod in south. Mogral is connected to rail through nearest stations Kumbla and Kasaragod. The nearest airport is at Mangalore (49 km).

Education, culture and health
Mogral has one government school, GVHSS Mogral. Other schools include Essa English Medium High School. A regional center for Study of  Mappila Pattu  and Folk Arts was set up at Mogral in 2009 under Mahakavi Mohin Kutty Vaidyar Memorial Center, Kondotty, Malappuram. Government Unani hospital Mogral is the only  hospital there under the government of Kerala, established in 1985 (Unani medicine).

Sports clubs
Mogral shuttle club (1976).

Mogral Sports Club (MSC) is one of the oldest (started 1918) sports clubs. There are sports clubs like Deenar Gally, Rising Stars, Citizen Kadavath, Koppalam F C, Rovers Mogral, Perwad Sports Club, Nadupallam FC and Priyadharsini sports club (1985) KK Puram, Nangi Club.

MSC is about a 100-year-old sports club which is popular for its football team which has won major titles in Kasaragod District and adjacent districts.

Mogral Soccer League (MSL)
MSL was the grand event of football which took place at Mogral. Tournament was an Indian Premier League (IPL) meets English Premier League(EPL) style seven-a-side football tournament organised by the Mogral  Sports Club U A E committee.

Players were selected by teams through auction which was a new experience to the people gathered.

Notable natives and residents 

Mogral has a rich history in the field of sports, cultural activities, literary works, politics, Religious studies, Motor sports etc.
In politics Ex MLA late MS Mogral, late MC Abdul Khader Haji and Late TM Kunhi are very renowned in their respective fields. Muhammad Shah Mogral commonly known as M.S Mogral BA (Presidency college Madras) was the first MLA of Kasaragod in Madras assembly in 1952. He served as first class magistrate in Kasaragod before 1952.
One of the most prominent scholars that hail from Mogral was Kota Abdul Khader Musliyar who was the joint secretary of Samastha Kerala Jamiyyathul Ulama and Qazi of Mangalore and 6 time National car rally co-driver champion Musa Sherif

References

5) [https://www.sportskeeda.com/football/mogral-soccer-league-for-the-football-crazy-village-of-mogral Mogral Soccer League - For the football crazy village of Mograll]

External links
 http://www.mymogral.com

Suburbs of Kasaragod